Veere is a municipality with a population of 22,000 and a town with a population of 1,500 in the southwestern Netherlands, in the region of Walcheren in the province of Zeeland.

History 
The name Veere means "ferry":  Wolfert Van Borssele established a ferry and ferry house there in 1281. This ferry he called the "camper-veer" or "Ferry of Campu" by which name Camphire it was known, at least in England, until the seventeenth century. It eventually became known as "de Veer". In the same year 1281 Wolfert also built the castle Sandenburg on one of the dikes he had built. On 12 November 1282, Count Floris V. thereupon issued a charter by which Wolfert received the sovereignty to the land and castle with the ferry and ferry house. From that time on Wolfert was given the title of Lord Van der Veer. Veere received city rights in 1355. 

The "Admiraliteit van Veere" (Admiralty of Veere) was set up as a result of the Ordinance on the Admiralty of 8 January 1488 in an attempt to create a central naval administration in the Burgundian Netherlands.  To this was subordinated the Vice-Admiralty of Flanders in Dunkirk.  In 1560 under admiral Philip de Montmorency, Count of Hoorn, this admiralty relocated near Ghent and in 1561 the Habsburg naval forces were also moved to Veere.

Veere functioned as the staple port for Scotland between 1541 and 1799. In Scotland it was known as Campvere. Until the Anglo-Dutch wars it was an important trading port for the import among other things, of saffron from East Anglian ports such as Wells.

Flemish architects Antonis Keldermans and Evert Spoorwater designed the Grote Kerk, the fortifications, the Cisterne and the town hall. During this period of prosperity, the cultural centre was located at Sandenburgh castle, the residence of the noble Van Borsele and Van Bourgondië families. Court painter Jan Gossaert van Mabuse worked here. The poet Adrianus Valerius lived and worked in the city from 1591. In the 17th and 18th centuries, Veere was a prosperous trading city, with about 750 houses inside the city walls then, compared to about 300 .

At the start of the Second World War, there was a Royal Netherlands Navy seaplane base at Veere, with six Fokker C XIV-W aircraft. On 12 May 1940 the base was bombed by He 111 bombers causing some casualties. On 14 May, the seaplanes were ordered to evacuate to France and then England, eventually arriving in the Dutch East Indies where they would be destroyed in action with the Japanese in 1941 and 1942. On 17 May, German infantry of SS Regiment Deutschland of the 2nd SS Panzer Division crossed onto Walcheren via the Sloedam and by 18:00 that evening, the Dutch forces on the island, including the garrison at Veere, were ordered to surrender. Veere was finally liberated on 7 November 1944 by Scottish troops of the British 52nd (Lowland) Infantry Division during Operation Infatuate, the Allied assault on Walcheren. As part of the preparations for the operation, the island's sea dykes were bombed resulting in the inundation of much of the area. Unlike many other towns on the island, Veere was virtually undamaged in the fighting.

As a result of the damming of the Veerse Gat inlet in 1961, the fishing fleet of Veere moved to a new home port at Colijnsplaat on Noord-Beveland.  the main business of the town is tourism.

Veere municipality reached its current expanded shape in 1997, after the addition of several neighboring towns. During the course of nearly two centuries seventeen historical municipalities have merged to become present-day Veere. Its original full name was Veere-de-Stad en Zanddijk-Binnen.

Geography 

The city of Veere stands on the Veerse Meer lagoon on the island of Walcheren in the province of Zeeland in the Netherlands.

The area of the municipality of Veere is 13,496 hectares, with a coastline of 34 kilometres and a population of about 22,000.

Population centres 
The population centres in the municipality are:

Tourism 
The area is visited by 4 million tourists annually. The main attractions are the beaches and marinas. The Storm Surge Barrier on the Oosterschelde is the most popular visitor attraction in Zeeland. The Scoutcentrum Zeeland on the coast of the Veerse Meer attracts Scout visitors from around the world

In fiction

The town of Veere forms the setting for "Van Loon's Lives", a book of contemporary fantasy written by Hendrik Willem Van Loon in 1942, in which the protagonists are able to magically summon the great men and women of history for weekend dinner parties, leading to often humorous incidents. The book was written at the time when Veere, like the rest of the Netherlands, lay under Nazi occupation, and despite its light-hearted tone clearly indicates the longing of the writer – living in the US – for his homeland whose liberation he was doomed never to see.

Scottish singer-songwriter Brian McNeill based the song "The Holland Trade" from his tenth studio album The Baltic tae Byzantium on the trade and cultural ties between Veere and Scotland from 1541 on.

Notable people 

 Maryn Adriansen (1600 in Veere – ca.1654) was a boatswain and early settler to New Netherland
 Peter Daane (1835 in Westkapelle – 1914) an American businessman and politician in Wisconsin
 Peter de Ru (born 1946 in Oostkapelle) a photographer in Sweden
 Maximiliaan de Vriendt (1559 at Zandenburg Castle, Veere – 1614) a new Latin poet
 Jurn de Vries (born 1940 in Vrouwenpolder) a Dutch theologian, former politician and journalist
 Nicolaas Everaerts (1461/62 in Grijpskerke – 1532) a Dutch jurist and academic
 Johannes Gabrielse (1881 in Westkapelle – 1945) a Dutch artist in the Dutch East Indies
 Wim Hofman (born 1941 in Oostkapelle) a Dutch author
 Johannes Hermanus Koekkoek (1778 in Veere – 1851) a Dutch painter and draughtsman
 Aert H. Kuipers (1919 in Oostkapelle or Middelburg – 2012) a Dutch linguistics professor who did fieldwork among First Nations people of British Columbia
 Hans Peter Minderhoud (born 1973 in Westkapelle) a Dutch dressage rider
 Matthijs Röling (born 1943 in Oostkapelle) a Dutch painter, graphic designer, draftsman and lithographer
 Franca Treur (born 1979 near Meliskerke) a Dutch writer and a freelance journalist
 Gerard von Brucken Fock (1859 in Koudekerke – 1935) a classical Dutch pianist, composer and painter
 Hans Wijers (born 1951 in Oostburg) a retired Dutch politician and chairman of the ING Group since 2018.

Gallery

References

External links

Official website
Veere in the picture, Beautiful photos of Veere. 
Website about the historic city of Veere

 
Cities in the Netherlands
Municipalities of Zeeland
Populated places in Zeeland
Walcheren
1355 establishments in Europe